Lü was a Zhou dynasty vassal state in present-day central China in the early years of the Spring and Autumn period (722–481 BC).

Origin
As the rulers of the four states of Qi, Xu, Shen and Lü all had the surname Jiang, they claimed a common ancestry.

See also
 Lü (surname)

References

Zhou dynasty
Nanyang, Henan
Ancient Chinese states
Former monarchies